T41 was a type of diesel-electric locomotive used by Swedish State Railways between 1956 and 1988 for secondary line services and later for shunting. It was built by Nydquist & Holm (NOHAB), who produced five locomotives under licence from General Motors Electro-Motive Division.

History
During the 1950s NOHAB of Trollhättan had started a cooperation with General Motors Electro-Motive Division to licence build GM-EMD diesel locomotives for the European market. SJ had bought one EMD G12 locomotive, retrospectively designated T42, in 1953 and after NOHAB had started building the DSB class MY and MX for Danske Statsbaner in 1953 SJ ordered five modified G12 locomotives in 1955 with delivery in 1956. It was originally designated T4, but this was later changed to T41.

The T41 allowed replacement of steam locomotives on non electrified lines. It served on Borås-Alvesta and Borlänge-Mora, and served both passenger and freight trains. In 1978 Siljansbanan was electrified and three T41s were retired while two were moved to Östersund with service on Inlandsbanan, and served until the 1988. Two are preserved by the Swedish Railway Museum.

Technical Description
Like the G12, the T41 uses a long hood and off-centre cab. However its hood is slightly lower and its cab is enlarged and taller than that of the G12.

External links
 Järnväg.net on T41

NOHAB locomotives
T41
A1A-A1A locomotives
Railway locomotives introduced in 1956
Standard gauge locomotives of Sweden